San Fiorano is a comune (municipality) in the Province of Lodi in the Italian region Lombardy, located about  southeast of Milan and about  southeast of Lodi.

The municipality of San Fiorano contains the frazioni (subdivisions, mainly villages and hamlets) Campone, Divizia, Lazzaretto, and Regone.

San Fiorano borders the following municipalities: Codogno, Maleo, Fombio, Santo Stefano Lodigiano.

Pictures

Demographic evolution

References

External links
 www.comune.sanfiorano.lo.it/
San Fiorano online: portal dedicated to San Fiorano and to San Fiorano's patron saint, St. Florian of Lorch
History, photos and info about San Fiorano and its patron saint, St. Florian of Lorch

Cities and towns in Lombardy